The U.S. state of Arizona is served by five telephone area codes in three numbering areas:

 Area codes 602, 480, and 623 serve the Phoenix metropolitan area. The three area codes were recombined in 2023 into an overlay complex after a 1999 split:
 The former 602 area consists of most of the city of Phoenix, with the exception of far northern areas and Ahwatukee.
 The former 480 area includes the East Valley, including Ahwatukee in the city of Phoenix and some communities in Pinal County such as San Tan Valley. Major cities include Mesa, Chandler, Gilbert, Scottsdale, and Tempe.
 The former 623 area includes the West Valley. Major cities include Glendale, Surprise, Buckeye, and Avondale.
 Area code 520 serves Southern Arizona, including Tucson and its metropolitan area, Casa Grande, Nogales, and Sierra Vista.
 Area code 928 includes the remainder of the state, including Yuma, Kingman, Flagstaff, Prescott, the Arizona portion of the Navajo Nation, and Safford.

602 was the original area code for Arizona and was split in 1995 into 602, serving metropolitan Phoenix, and 520, serving the remainder of the state. In 1999, 602 was split into 480, 602, and 623, which were later recombined in 2023. 520 was split in 2001 to form area code 928.

See also
 List of NANP area codes
 North American Numbering Plan

References

External links

 
Arizona
Area codes